Bourbon Democrat was a term used in the United States in the later 19th century (1872–1904) to refer to members of the Democratic Party who were ideologically aligned with fiscal conservatism or classical liberalism, especially those who supported presidential candidates Charles O'Conor in 1872, Samuel J. Tilden in 1876, President Grover Cleveland in 1884, 1888, and 1892 and Alton B. Parker in 1904.

After 1904, the Bourbons faded away. Southerner Woodrow Wilson made a deal in 1912 with the leading opponent of the Bourbons, William Jennings Bryan: Bryan endorsed Wilson for the Democratic nomination and Wilson named Bryan Secretary of State. Bourbon Democrats were promoters of a form of laissez-faire capitalism which included opposition to the high-tariff protectionism that the Republicans were then advocating as well as fiscal discipline. They represented business interests, generally supporting the goals of banking and railroads, but opposed to subsidies for them and were unwilling to protect them from competition. They opposed American imperialism and overseas expansion, fought for the gold standard against bimetallism, and promoted what they called "hard" and "sound" money. Strong supporters of states' rights and reform movements such as the Civil Service Reform and opponents of the corrupt city bosses, Bourbons led the fight against the Tweed Ring. The anti-corruption theme earned the votes of many Republican Mugwumps in 1884.

The term "Bourbon Democrats" was never used by the Bourbon Democrats themselves. It was not the name of any specific or formal group and no one running for office ever ran on a Bourbon Democrat ticket. The term "Bourbon" – Bourbon whisky is a Southern drink – was mostly used disparagingly by critics complaining of viewpoints they saw as old-fashioned. A number of splinter Democratic parties, such as the Straight-Out Democratic Party (1872) and the National Democratic Party (1896), that actually ran candidates, fall under the more general label of Bourbon Democrats.

Factional history

Origins of the term 

The nickname "Bourbon Democrat" was first used as a pun, referring to bourbon whiskey from Kentucky and even more to the Bourbon Dynasty of France, which was overthrown in the French Revolution, but returned to power in 1815 to rule in a reactionary fashion until its overthrow in the July Revolution of 1830. A cadet Bourbon branch, the House of Orléans, then ruled France for 18 years (1830–1848), until it too was overthrown in the February Revolution. Other branches of the House of Bourbon ruled Spain from 1700 and the Kingdom of the Two Sicilies (Naples and Sicily) from 1759. The latter was overthrown in 1861 when Italian troops under the command of Giuseppe Garibaldi overthrew Francis II, a major advance for the Italian Risorgimento. Spain's Queen Isabella II was overthrown in 1868 when liberal democrats seized power in the Glorious Revolution. Isabella's son returned to take the throne as King Alfonso XII six years later. A widely quoted aphorism at the time had it that the Bourbons "have learnt nothing, and forgotten nothing." During Reconstruction, the term "Bourbon" would have had the connotation of a retrogressive, reactionary dynasty out of step with the modern world.     

The term was occasionally used in the 1860s and 1870s to refer to conservative Democrats (both North and South) who still held the ideas of Thomas Jefferson and Andrew Jackson and in the 1870s to refer to the regimes set up in the South by Redeemers as a conservative reaction against Reconstruction.

Gold Democrats and William Jennings Bryan 
The electoral system elevated Bourbon Democrat leader Grover Cleveland to the office of President both in 1884 and in 1892, but the support for the movement declined considerably in the wake of the Panic of 1893. President Cleveland, a staunch believer in the gold standard, refused to inflate the money supply with silver, thus alienating the agrarian populist wing of the Democratic Party.

The delegates at the 1896 Democratic National Convention quickly turned against the policies of Cleveland and those advocated by the Bourbon Democrats, favoring bimetallism as a way out of the depression. Nebraska Congressman William Jennings Bryan now took the stage as the great opponent of the Bourbon Democrats. Harnessing the energy of an agrarian insurgency with his famous Cross of Gold speech, Congressman Bryan soon became the Democratic nominee for president in the 1896 election.

Some of the Bourbons sat out the 1896 election or tacitly supported William McKinley, the Republican nominee, whereas others set up the third-party ticket of the National Democratic Party led by John M. Palmer, a former Governor of Illinois. These bolters, called "Gold Democrats", mostly returned to the Democratic Party by 1900 or by 1904 at the latest. Bryan demonstrated his hold on the party by winning the 1900 and 1908 Democratic nominations as well. In 1904, a Bourbon, Alton B. Parker, won the nomination and lost in the presidential race as did Bryan every time.

Decline 
The nomination of Alton Parker in 1904 gave a victory of sorts to pro-gold Democrats, but it was a fleeting one. The old classical liberal ideals had lost their distinctiveness and appeal. By World War I, the key elder statesman in the movement John M. Palmer – as well as Simon Bolivar Buckner, William F. Vilas and Edward Atkinson – had died. During the 20th century, classical liberal ideas never influenced a major political party as much as they influenced the Democrats in the early 1890s.

State histories

West Virginia 
West Virginia was formed in 1863 after Unionists from northwestern Virginia establish the Restored Government of Virginia. It remained in Republican control until the passing of the Flick Amendment in 1871 returned states rights to West Virginians who had supported the defunct Confederacy. A Democratic push led to a reformatting of the West Virginia State Constitution that resulted in more power to the Democratic Party. In 1877, Henry M. Mathews, as a Bourbon, was elected governor of the state and the Bourbons held onto power in the state until the 1893 election of Republican George W. Atkinson.

Louisiana 
In the spring of 1896, mayor John Fitzpatrick of New Orleans, leader of the city's Bourbon Democratic organization, left office after a scandal-ridden administration, his chosen successor badly defeated by reform candidate Walter C. Flower. However, Fitzpatrick and his associates quickly regrouped, organizing themselves on December 29 into the Choctaw Club, which soon received considerable patronage from Louisiana governor and Fitzpatrick ally Murphy Foster. Fitzpatrick, a power at the 1898 Louisiana Constitutional Convention, was instrumental in exempting immigrants from the new educational and property requirements designed to disenfranchise blacks. In 1899, he managed the successful mayoral campaign of Bourbon candidate Paul Capdevielle.

Mississippi 
Mississippi in 1877–1902 was politically controlled by the conservative whites, called "Bourbons" by their critics. The Bourbons represented the planters, landowners and merchants and used coercion and cash to control enough black votes to control the Democratic Party conventions and thus state government. Elected to the House of Representatives in 1885 and serving until 1901, Mississippi Democrat Thomas C. Catchings participated in the politics of both presidential terms of Grover Cleveland, particularly the free silver controversy and the agrarian discontent that culminated in populism. As a "gold bug" supporter of sound money, he found himself defending Cleveland from attacks of silverite Mississippians over the 1893 repeal of the Sherman Silver Purchase Act and other of Cleveland's actions unpopular in the South. Caught in the middle between his loyalty to Cleveland and the Southern Democrat silverites, Catchings continued as a sound money legislative leader for the minority in Congress while hoping that Mississippi Democrats would return to the conservative philosophical doctrines of the original Bourbon Democrats in the South.

Prominent Bourbon Democrats

See also 
 Blue Dog Coalition
 Classical liberalism
 Conservative Democrat
 History of the United States Democratic Party
 Libertarian Democrat
 Southern Democrats

Footnotes

Further reading 
 David T. Beito and Linda Royster Beito, "Gold Democrats and the Decline of Classical Liberalism, 1896–1900", Independent Review 4 (Spring 2000), 555–575.
 Allen J. Going, Bourbon Democracy in Alabama, 1874–1890, Tuscaloosa, AL: University of Alabama Press, 1951.
 Roger L. Hart, Redeemers, Bourbons and Populists: Tennessee, 1870–1896, Baton Rouge, LA: Louisiana State University Press, 1975.
 Allan Nevins. Grover Cleveland A study in courage (1938).
 C. Vann Woodward, Origins of the New South, 1877–1913, Baton Rouge, LA: Louisiana State University Press, 1951.
 William Ivy Hair, Bourbonism and Agrarian Protest: Louisiana Politics, 1877-1900, Baton Rouge, LA: Louisiana State University Press, 1969.

Primary sources 
 Allan Nevins (ed.), The Letters of Grover Cleveland, 1850–1908, Boston, Houghton Mifflin, 1933.
 William L. Wilson, The Cabinet Diary of William L. Wilson, 1896–1897, Chapel Hill, NC: University of North Carolina Press, 1957.
 Democratic Party National Committee.  Campaign Text-book of the National Democratic Party (1896). This was the campaign textbook of the Gold Democrats and is filled with speeches and arguments.
 Encyclopedia of Alabama, "Alabama Bourbons".

1872 establishments in the United States
1912 disestablishments in the United States
1896 elections in the United States
Anti-imperialism
Civil service reform in the United States
Classical liberalism
Conservatism in the United States
Factions in the Democratic Party (United States)
Liberalism in the United States
Progressive Era in the United States
Bourbon Democrats